Postplatyptilia nielseni is a moth of the family Pterophoridae. It is known from Argentina.

The wingspan is 16–18 mm. Adults are on wing from December to February.

References

nielseni
Moths described in 1991